Diego Silva Nascimento Santos (born 6 February 1998), better known as Diego Carioca, is a Brazilian professional footballer who plays as a left winger for Azerbaijani club Sumgayit on loan from Ukrainian club Kolos Kovalivka.

References

External links 
 
 Player's profile at pressball.by
 

1998 births
Sportspeople from Niterói
Living people
Brazilian footballers
Association football midfielders
Brazilian expatriate footballers
Grêmio Foot-Ball Porto Alegrense players
Clube Esportivo Aimoré players
Clube Esportivo Lajeadense players
FC Vitebsk players
FC Shakhtyor Soligorsk players
FC Kolos Kovalivka players
Jagiellonia Białystok players
Zalaegerszegi TE players
Sumgayit FK players
Belarusian Premier League players
Ukrainian Premier League players
Ekstraklasa players
Nemzeti Bajnokság I players
Azerbaijan Premier League players
Expatriate footballers in Belarus
Brazilian expatriate sportspeople in Belarus
Expatriate footballers in Ukraine
Brazilian expatriate sportspeople in Ukraine
Expatriate footballers in Poland
Brazilian expatriate sportspeople in Poland
Expatriate footballers in Hungary
Brazilian expatriate sportspeople in Hungary
Expatriate footballers in Azerbaijan
Brazilian expatriate sportspeople in Azerbaijan